Quitman School District is a public school district in Quitman, Mississippi.

Quitman School District may also refer to:

 Quitman School District (Arkansas), Quitman, Arkansas
 Quitman County School District (Georgia)
 Quitman County School District (Mississippi), Marks, Mississippi
 Quitman Independent School District, Quitman, Texas

See also
 Quitman High School (disambiguation)
 Quitman (disambiguation)